Hang time generally refers to how long a (self-)launched object stays in the air:
 In basketball, the length of time a player stays in the air after jumping to score or pass the ball.
 In American football, the length of time a punted ball flies through the air.
 In Australian rules football, the length of time a player is supported above other players while engaged in an aerial contest, for example attempting a Spectacular mark, Spoil or Ruck.
 In some first-person shooters, the length of time a player flies through the air as the result of a grenade jump.

Hang time may also refer to:
 NBA Hangtime, a 1996 basketball arcade game by Midway Games
 HangTime (roller coaster), a roller coaster at Knotts' Berry Farm
 Hang Time (album), a 1988 album by Soul Asylum

 Hang Time (TV series), an American television show that aired from 1995 to 2000